Thomas Henry Johnston (born 26 August 1880) was a New Zealand tram conductor, labourer, miner and strike-breaker. He was born in Richmond, Victoria, Australia on 26 August 1880.

References

1880 births
New Zealand miners
Australian emigrants to New Zealand
People from Richmond, Victoria
Year of death missing